Yoandy Leal Hidalgo (born 31 August 1988) is a volleyball player who plays as a wing-spiker for Italian club Gas Sales Piacenza. Born in Cuba, he is a former member of the Cuba men's national team (2007–2010) and currently represents Brazil (since 2019) after gained the Brazilian citizenship in June 2015.

Leal played four years with the Cuban national team, debuting at the 2007 FIVB Volleyball Men's U21 World Championship. In the 2008 World Olympic Qualification Tournament in Düsseldorf that would give a spot at the 2008 Summer Olympics. Cuba did not qualify, finishing second to hosts Germany, but Leal was chosen Best Spiker and Server of the championship. His last tournament with Cuba was the 2010 FIVB Volleyball Men's World Championship, where Leal won the silver medal.

Still pursuing his dream of playing in the Olympics, Leal left Cuba in 2010, establishing himself in volleyball potency Brazil in the city of Belo Horizonte. After two years of not playing, Leal signed with local team Sada Cruzeiro. Soon he was a vital part of the team, winning two editions each of the Brazilian Superligas, South American Championships, and FIVB Volleyball Men's Club World Championship. Leal started his naturalization process in 2013, and in 2015 he was given Brazilian nationality. Afterward, he contacted the Fédération Internationale de Volleyball to see how soon he could play for Brazil's national team, as team coach Bernardo Rezende already expressed interest in having Leal in the squad for the 2016 Summer Olympics.

Sporting achievements

Clubs
 CEV Champions League
  2018/2019 – with Cucine Lube Civitanova

 FIVB Club World Championship
  Betim 2013 – with Sada Cruzeiro
  Betim 2015 – with Sada Cruzeiro
  Betim 2016 – with Sada Cruzeiro
  Poland 2018 – with Cucine Lube Civitanova
  Betim 2019 – with Cucine Lube Civitanova

 CSV South American Club Championship
  Belo Horizonte 2014 – with Sada Cruzeiro
  Taubate 2016 – with Sada Cruzeiro
  Montes Claros 2017 – with Sada Cruzeiro

 National championships
 2013/2014  Brazilian Championship, with Sada Cruzeiro
 2013/2014  Brazilian Cup, with Sada Cruzeiro
 2014/2015  Brazilian Championship, with Sada Cruzeiro
 2015/2016  Brazilian Championship, with Sada Cruzeiro
 2015/2016  Brazilian Cup, with Sada Cruzeiro
 2016/2017  Brazilian Championship, with Sada Cruzeiro
 2018/2019  Italian Championship, with Cucine Lube Civitanova
 2022/2023  Italian Cup, with Gas Sales Bluenergy Piacenza

Individual awards
 2010: FIVB World League – Best Server
 2013: FIVB Club World Championship – Best Spiker
 2014: CSV South American Club Championship – Best Spiker
 2015: CSV South American Club Championship – Best Spiker
 2015: FIVB Club World Championship – Most Valuable Player
 2016: CSV South American Club Championship – Most Valuable Player
 2016: FIVB Club World Championship – Best Spiker
 2017: CSV South American Club Championship – Best Spiker
 2017: CSV South American Club Championship – Most Valuable Player
 2017: FIVB Club World Championship – Best Outside Spiker
 2019: Memorial of Hubert Jerzy Wagner – Most Valuable Player
 2019: CSV South American Championship – Best Outside Spiker
 2021: FIVB Nations League – Best Outside Spiker
 2022: FIVB World Championship – Best Outside Spiker
 2023: Italian Cup – Most Valuable Player

References

External links

 Player profile at CEV.eu
 Player profile at LegaVolley.it
 Player profile at Volleybox.net
 Player profile at WorldofVolley.com

1988 births
Living people
Brazilian men's volleyball players
Cuban men's volleyball players
Naturalized citizens of Brazil
Sportspeople from Havana
Expatriate sportspeople in Brazil
Pan American Games medalists in volleyball
Pan American Games bronze medalists for Cuba
Volleyball players at the 2007 Pan American Games
Medalists at the 2007 Pan American Games
Volleyball players at the 2020 Summer Olympics
Olympic volleyball players of Brazil
Outside hitters